George Peel Gilmour B.A, M.A, Ph.D. (March 14, 1900 – July 12, 1963) was a Canadian university president. He was the youngest chancellor of McMaster University, serving from 1941 to 1949, then serving under the title of president and vice-chancellor until 1961. Gilmour Hall, the building containing the office of the president and the office of the registrar at McMaster University, is named after him.

Born in Hamilton, Ontario, Canada, he received three degrees from McMaster and did post-graduate work at Oxford and Yale.

During his lifetime, he held positions in the Baptist Convention in Ontario and Quebec and was president of the Canadian Council of Churches from 1946 to 1948.

He was named citizen of the year by the City of Hamilton in 1950, and was inducted into Hamilton's Gallery of Distinction in 1987. Gilmour received eight honorary degrees, and was named Hamilton's Man of the Year in 1950.

McMaster career 
Gilmour started as a professor of history at McMaster, taking the Chair of Church History in 1920.

During his tenure as president, Gilmour oversaw the construction of nine buildings on McMaster's main campus, including the McMaster Nuclear Reactor and McMaster Divinity College.

Degrees Received 

 B.A, B.Th, B.D. – 1921 – McMaster University 
 M.A, PhD – McMaster University
 M.A, M.D. – Yale University

References

1900 births
1963 deaths
Chancellors of McMaster University
Academic staff of McMaster University
People from Hamilton, Ontario